The 16th Army Aviation Brigade (Ukrainian: 16-та окрема бригада армійської авіації) (formerly, the 3rd Army Aviation Regiment (Ukrainian: 3-й полк армійської авіації) prior to 2012) is an army aviation formation of the Ukrainian Ground Forces. The brigade is part of the 8th Army Corps.

History

The brigade began its service as the 119th Separate Helicopter Regiment of the 13th Army. Later the regiment was transferred to the 38th Army Corps. On August 26, 2004 the Regiment was reformed into a Brigade. In 2005 the Brigade was transferred to the 8th Army Corps.

Structure
In 2004 Brigade consisted of 2 Squadron's flying Mi-24 and Mi-8 helicopters.

Equipment
 Mi-24
 Mi-8MT

References

 https://web.archive.org/web/20071113201139/http://www.vu.mil.gov.ua/index.php?part=article&id=543
 International Air Power Review #15

Brigades of Ukraine
Army aviation brigades
Aviation history of Ukraine